Aspinall may refer to:

People 
 Aspinall (surname), including a list of people with the name

Places 
 Aspinall, West Virginia, United States
 The Aspinall Unit of the Colorado River Storage Project

Organisations 
 Crown London Aspinalls, private gambling club in London
 Lightbown Aspinall, English wallpaper company
 The Aspinall Foundation, British charity

Other uses 
 L&YR Class 2 (Aspinall), locomotive

See also 
 Aspinwall (disambiguation)